Sevinçli may refer to:

 Sevinçli, Aksaray, village in Aksaray Province, Turkey
 Sevinçli, İmamoğlu, village in Adana Province, Turkey